Krukow or Kruków may refer to:

 Places in Germany
Krukow, Mecklenburg-Vorpommern, a village in Mecklenburg-Vorpommern
Krukow, Schleswig-Holstein, a municipality in Schleswig-Holstein
 Places in Poland
Kruków, Lower Silesian Voivodeship (south-west Poland)
Kruków, Lublin Voivodeship (east Poland)
Kruków, Świętokrzyskie Voivodeship (south-central Poland)
 People
Mike Krukow, American baseball player and television commentator

See also
 

pl:Kruków